Gregory Holloway Sr. (born December 27, 1957) is an American politician. He is a member of the Mississippi House of Representatives from the 76th District, being first elected in 1999. He is a member of the Democratic Party.
He is married to April Holloway, who is the Tax Collector of Copiah County.  They reside in their native Hazlehurst, Mississippi.

References

1957 births
Living people
Democratic Party members of the Mississippi House of Representatives
African-American state legislators in Mississippi
21st-century American politicians
21st-century African-American politicians
20th-century African-American people